Miguel Ângelo Moreira de Magalhães (born 19 April 1999), sometimes known as Maga, is a Portuguese professional footballer who plays for Oliveirense] as a defender.

Club career
On 6 August 2017, Maga made his professional debut with Vitória Guimarães B in a 2017–18 LigaPro match against Varzim. On 7 July 2022, Maga transferred to Liga Portugal 2 club Oliveirense.

References

External links

1999 births
People from Marco de Canaveses
Living people
Portuguese footballers
Association football defenders
Liga Portugal 2 players
Vitória S.C. B players
Vitória S.C. players
U.D. Oliveirense players
Sportspeople from Porto District